The Christuskirche (Christ Church) was a Protestant church in northern Königsberg, Germany.

Construction of the church began in 1924, with its dedication occurring on 8 August 1926. It was built near the intersection of Wallring and Dessauer Straße in northern Tragheim; to the west was the Haus der Technik and to the east was the Kunsthalle.

The church was heavily damaged by the 1944 Bombing of Königsberg and 1945 Battle of Königsberg. Its ruins were demolished by 1960. A shopping centre has been built in its place in Kaliningrad, Russia.

References

1926 establishments in Germany
1945 disestablishments in Germany
20th-century Protestant churches
Buildings and structures in Germany destroyed during World War II
Destroyed churches in Germany
Former churches in Königsberg
Lutheran churches in Königsberg
Churches completed in 1926
Christian organizations established in 1926